The Savage Detectives  (Spanish: Los Detectives Salvajes) is a novel by the Chilean author Roberto Bolaño published in 1998. Natasha Wimmer's English translation was published by Farrar, Straus and Giroux in 2007. The novel tells the story of the search for a 1920s Mexican poet, Cesárea Tinajero, by two 1970s poets, the Chilean Arturo Belano (alter ego of Bolaño) and the Mexican Ulises Lima.

Plot summary
The novel is narrated in first person by several narrators and divided into three parts. The first section, "Mexicans Lost in Mexico", set in late 1975, is told by 17-year-old aspiring poet, Juan García Madero. It centers on his admittance to a roving gang of poets who refer to themselves as the Visceral Realists. He drops out of university and travels around Mexico City, becoming increasingly involved with the adherents of Visceral Realism, although he remains uncertain about Visceral Realism.

The book's second section, "The Savage Detectives," comprises nearly two-thirds of the novel's total length. The section is a polyphonic narrative which features more than forty narrators and spans twenty years, from 1976 to 1996. It consists of interviews with a variety of characters from locations around North America, Europe, the Middle East and Africa, all of whom have come into contact with the founding leaders of the Visceral Realists, Ulises Lima and Arturo Belano. Each narrator has his or her own opinion of the two, although the consensus is that they are drifters and literary elitists whose behavior often leaves a bitter taste in the mouths of those they meet. We learn that the two spent some years in Europe, frequenting bars and camp sites, and generally living a bohemian lifestyle. Lima, the more introverted of the two, serves a short sentence in an Israeli prison, while Belano challenges a literary critic to an absurd sword fight on a Spanish beach.

The third section of the book, "The Deserts of Sonora", is again narrated by Juan García Madero, and chronologically takes place straight after the first section, now in the Sonora Desert in January 1976, with Lima, Belano and a prostitute named Lupe. The section involves the "Savage Detectives" closing in on Cesárea Tinajero, an elusive poet who is the founder of Visceral Realism, while they are chased by a pimp named Alberto and a corrupt Mexican police officer.

Characters

A partial character list.

Critical reception

Several critics have compared the novel to Rayuela (translated into English as Hopscotch) by Argentinian novelist Julio Cortázar, whom Bolaño greatly respected, both because of its non-linear structure and its portrayal of young, bohemian artists.

James Wood wrote in The New York Times, "A novel all about poetry and poets, one of whose heroes is a lightly disguised version of the author himself: how easily this could be nothing more than a precious lattice of ludic narcissism and unbearably "literary" adventures... The novel is wildly enjoyable (as well as, finally, full of lament), in part because Bolaño, despite all the game-playing, has a worldly, literal sensibility."

Benjamin Kunkel, writing for London Review of Books, "It’s something close to a miracle that Bolaño can produce such intense narrative interest in a book made up of centrifugal monologues spinning away from two absentee main characters, and the diary entries of its most peripheral figure. And yet, in spite of the book’s apparent (and often real) formlessness, a large part of its distinction is its virtually unprecedented achievement in multiply-voiced narration."

Slate wrote, "The Savage Detectives sings a love song to the grandeur of Latin American literature and to the passions it inspires, and there is no reason to suppose that, in spite of every prediction, these particular grandeurs and passions have reached their appointed end."

Elements in common with 2666

2666, Bolaño's final, posthumous novel has many points in common with The Savage Detectives.

Both conclude in the fictional city of Santa Teresa, in the Mexican state of Sonora, which acts as a stand-in for Ciudad Juárez.
In the second part of The Savage Detectives, an author named Arcimboldi is mentioned. In 2666 he will become the central character Benno von Archimboldi.
In a dialogue about Cesárea Tinajero, the year 2600 is referred to as "the year of misfortunes".
Late in the novel there is a section where, 'Cesárea said something about days to come... and the teacher, to change the subject, asked her what times she meant and when they would be. And Cesárea named a date, sometime around the year 2600. Two thousand six hundred and something.'

According to the Note to the First Edition of 2666, among Bolaño's notes is a line saying that "The narrator of 2666 is Arturo Belano," a character from The Savage Detectives, as well as a line for the end of 2666, "And that's it, friends. I've done it all, I've lived it all. If I had the strength, I'd cry. I bid you all goodbye, Arturo Belano".

References

External links
 Review of The Savage Detectives at The New Yorker
 Review of The Savage Detectives at The New York Times Book Review

1998 Chilean novels
Works by Roberto Bolaño
Novels set in Mexico City
Editorial Anagrama books
Roman à clef novels
Postmodern novels